Lepra lichexanthonorstictica is a species of crustose and corticolous (bark-dwelling) lichen in the family Pertusariaceae. Found in Brazil, it was formally described as a new species in 2021 by Dutch lichenologist André Aptroot. The lichen is named after its two major secondary compounds, lichexanthone and norstictic acid. Lepra lichexanthonorstictica has a thin, smooth and glossy thallus ranging in colour from white to very pale yellowish. The thallus has discrete, rounded soralia measuring about 0.5–0.9 mm in diameter.

References

Pertusariales
Lichen species
Lichens described in 2021
Lichens of South Brazil
Taxa named by André Aptroot